Otto Szász (11 December 1884, Hungary – 19 December 1952, Cincinnati, Ohio) was a Hungarian mathematician who worked on real analysis, in particular on Fourier series. He proved the Müntz–Szász theorem and introduced the Szász–Mirakyan operator. The Hungarian Mathematical and Physical Society awarded him the Julius König prize in 1939.

Publications

References

19th-century Hungarian mathematicians
20th-century Hungarian mathematicians
Hungarian Jews
1884 births
1952 deaths